Asterius of Petra was a convert from Arianism, and later the Bishop of Petra. 

At the Council of Sardica, in 343, Asterius denounced Arianism, as a heresy. This led to his exile in Libya, at the command of Emperor Constantius II.  

In 362, he was restored to his position of Bishop of Petra, by Emperor Julian. Asterius attended the Council of Alexandria, where he was chosen as the delegate to carry a letter to the Church of Antioch, where he provided a report of the proceedings at the council for the church leaders of Antioch. He died in Petra in 365.

References

365 deaths
Saints from the Holy Land
4th-century Christian saints
4th-century Syrian bishops
Year of birth unknown